The 1928 United States Senate election in Pennsylvania was held on November 6, 1928. Incumbent Republican U.S. Senator David A. Reed successfully sought re-election to another term, defeating Democratic nominee William N. McNair.

General election

Candidates
Elisha K. Kane (Prohibition)
Charles Kutz (Socialist Labor)
William N. McNair, Pittsburgh attorney (Democratic)
David A. Reed, incumbent U.S. Senator (Republican)
William H. Thomas (Socialist Labor)
William J. Van Essen (Socialist)
W. J. White (Workers)

Results

References

1928
Pennsylvania
United States Senate